The following lists events that happened during 1962 in the Grand Duchy of Luxembourg.

Incumbents

Events

 18 March – Luxembourg City hosts the Eurovision Song Contest 1962 after Jean-Claude Pascal's victory the previous year.  Representing Luxembourg, Camillo Felgen finishes third with the song Petit bonhomme.
 2 June – A law is passed encouraging foreign direct investment in Luxembourg by giving the government the power to grant tax breaks for foreign firms making capital investment.

Births
 15 April – Romain Schneider, politician
 13 September – Michel Wolter, politician

Deaths

Footnotes

References